Diyar Al Muharraq is a complex of seven artificial islands in the archipelago of Bahrain, located  northeast of the capital, Manama, on Bahrain Island.

History
It is named after Muharraq Island, which is located near it. In December 2015 Dragon City Mall, a Chinese-themed shopping center operated by Chinamex, was completed on the islands. In January 2016, the development of the luxury-themed Marassi Residences within the islands' Marassi Al Bahrain complex was announced, with completion planned in 2018.

Demography
Diyar Al Maharraq covers seven artificial islands that are designed to be a self-contained city with commercial and residential facilities. The islands began to be inhabited in 2015. The current population number is unknown.

Administration
The islands belong to the Muharraq Governorate.

Transportation
The islands have a causeway connecting them to Muharraq Island, the main island can be reached by public transport via buses and also have a large marina.

Social Housing 
The Diyar Al Muharraq plan includes the construction of social housing projects on 1.2 million m2 for 133 units northwest of the artificial island in an area called Deerat Al Oyoun.Bahrain.  $366 million of the project was financed by 4 banks (Al Salam Bank-Bahrain, Kuwait Finance House, Bank of Bahrain and Kuwait, and Al Baraka Islamic Bank of Bahrain).

Image gallery

See also 
 List of islands of Bahrain

References

External links 
 Official website

Populated places in the Muharraq Governorate
Islands of Bahrain
Artificial islands of Bahrain
Islands of the Persian Gulf